The Merchant Marine Act of 1928 (also called the "Jones-White Act") is a United States law to stimulate private shipbuilding in the United States and to assist the merchant marine financially in being competitive in the emerging global market. It is printed in the United States Code in Title 46A (Shipping Appendix) Chapter 24A.

It was sponsored by Sen. Wesley L. Jones (R) of Washington and Sen. Wallace H. White (R) of Maine. It did not repeal the La Follette Seamen's Act of 1915, but instead created Federal export subsidies to big shipping firms. The subsidies were purported to offset the cost of having to pay seamen higher wages under the earlier act; however, the subsidies were larger than wage differences.

References 

United States federal admiralty and maritime legislation
United States Merchant Marine